Rita Lee is the third solo album by Rita Lee released following her split with Tutti Frutti. Heavily influenced by the disco sound that was popular at the time, Rita Lee can be seen as a transitional album with Lee veering away from her signature stadium rock sound towards a more accessible mainstream sound. The album is noted for being the first of many collaborations to follow with her now husband, Roberto de Carvalho.

Track listing

Certifications and sales

References

1979 albums
Rita Lee albums
Som Livre albums